Ealing Comedy is a 2008 British comedy film, written by Jon Croker and directed by Neville Raschid. It was premiered at the Ealing Empire on 18 March 2008.

Plot

A second generation British Asian accountant (Alfie Singh) wants to be a film producer. He has an idea for the eponymous film called Ealing Comedy, about an accountant turned film producer called Alfie Singh. Alfie will play himself and his real son, Paul, will play his son in the film.  Unable to raise finance he decides to make the film himself. The film chronicles his life with his Irish wife and teenage son and his struggles to finance and make the film while keeping his family together.

Cast
 Leena Dhingra - Grandimort
 Kulvinder Ghir - Alfie Singh
 Alistair McGowan - Vijay Imran Cecil Kuttuputtu Yogesh
 Sasha Waddell - Mary Singh
 Paul Raschid - Paul Singh

References

External links
 Official Website
 
 Westside Magazine feature on Ealing Comedy

2008 films
British comedy films
2008 comedy films
2000s English-language films
2000s British films